Verbesina chapmanii, commonly known as Chapman's crownbeard,  is a flowering plant in the family Asteraceae and the genus Verbesina. It is a perennial dicot.

It is native to the Florida panhandle, growing in fire prone pine flatwoods. The plant has wingless stems and rough hairy leaves. The yellow flowers emerge in June to August.

References

Flora of the United States
chapmanii